Wild Goose Canyon is a stream, in Millard County, Utah, USA.

References

Rivers of Millard County, Utah
Rivers of Utah